Southern Discomfort is the second studio album by the band Rehab. It is their second album, released on October 24, 2000. The album's title refers to Southern Comfort, a brand of liquor. The album includes the hit songs "It Don't Matter" and "Sittin' At A Bar".

Track listing

Personnel
Danny "Boone" Alexander - Vocals
Jason "Brooks" Buford - Vocals

References

2000 albums
Rehab (band) albums